Fiann Paul (born 15 August 1980) is an Icelandic explorer, athlete, artist, speaker and Jungian psychoanalyst. He is the world's most record-breaking explorer, and holds the world's highest number of performance-based Guinness World Records ever achieved within a single athletic discipline (41 total / 33 performance based), ranking above Roger Federer (max and current 36 / 27) and Michael Phelps (max 26 / 24, current 21 / 19) as of 2020.

Fiann is known for being the fastest ocean rower (2016) and the most record-breaking ocean rower (2017). As of 2020, he is the first and only person to achieve the Ocean Explorers Grand Slam (performing open-water crossings on each of the five oceans using human-powered vessels). For comparison, about 70 people have achieved the land Explorers Grand Slam.

Fiann holds many of the highest honors in ocean rowing history, including the world's highest number of performance-based "World’s First" Guinness titles (a total of 14, overcoming Reinhold Messner, who holds a total of 9 as of 2020). These titles are known also as "Historical Firsts", typically awarded by Guinness for pioneering achievements such as "First to row 5 oceans", "First to hold current speed records on all 4 oceans". Fiann holds several "World's First" titles for polar explorations, such as being the first to row some of the most extreme major seas of both polar regions.

He was the captain of the most record-breaking expedition in history, stroke of the fastest boat in ocean rowing history and stroke of the overall speed record-breaking crossings of each ocean. As of 2020, he was the captain of the only three successful human-powered pioneering expeditions into the open-waters of both polar regions.

Fiann's achievements were a major contributor to Iceland becoming the country to hold the world's highest number of sports-related Guinness World Records per capita. Since 2017, his records constituted the majority of the total number of Iceland's sports Guinness World Records (76% as of 2020).

Fiann is also active in the fields of art and psychology, and has raised attention as someone uniquely combining different fields of activity.

Sports

Speed records 
Fiann has crossed all five oceans in an unsupported human-powered row boat with world-record-breaking speed, setting the overall speed records for the Atlantic, Indian, Pacific and Arctic Ocean (he achieved the only human-powered crossing of the Antarctic Ocean and as a result no speed record was adjudicated due to lack of competition).

2011 
In 2011 Fiann acted as a stroke of Sara G which earned the title of "the Fastest Boat in ocean rowing history", established an overall speed record for the Atlantic Ocean and won the Blue Riband Trophy of Ocean Rowing. Their course, The Atlantic Trade Winds I is the most competitive ocean rowing route, sought by rowing legends, such as James Cracknell OBE, and endurance athletes such as Mark Beaumont BEM.

2014, 2 oceans 
In 2014 Fiann became the first person to simultaneously hold overall speed records for the fastest rowing across 2 oceans (Atlantic and Indian). Throughout his career Fiann broke four oars. Three were destroyed in maritime storms and the fourth was shattered during an evacuation mission on the Indian Ocean aboard Avalon, when a tanker, Nordic River arrived to save an injured crew member, yet began to pull the small craft disastrously into its propeller, five times the height of the boat itself. The oar broke in Fiann's hands while pushing the rowers’ boat away from the tanker, saving the crew from collision, as the crew radioed the tanker to cut its engines just in time.

In addition to another collision, this time with a blue whale, the critical steering cable broke, which forced the crew to manually steer the boat, thereby reducing the rowing deck to two rowers per shift; half of what it is designed for. Finally, after sustaining injuries passing through a hurricane, the crew narrowed down to only 3 rowers in total (1.5 per shift), who had to power a 2-ton heavy boat designed to be rowed by 8. The incomplete crew had to row 2:40hr on, 1:20hr off shifts instead of the standard 2h:2h pattern in order to maintain their course. This extreme challenge put crew members into a lengthy delirium, lasting many days due to severe exhaustion and sleep deprivation.

2016, 3 oceans 
In 2016 Fiann became the only rower ever to achieve all three overall speed records (Atlantic, Indian, Mid-Pacific) and the only rower to hold all three records simultaneously. Upon this achievement, he was awarded by Guinness World Records the title of "The first person to hold simultaneous overall speed records for ocean rowing all three oceans", one of the highest honors in the history of ocean rowing.

2017, 4 oceans 
In 2017 he expanded his title by rowing the Arctic Ocean, becoming the first person to row 4 oceans and earning the Arctic Ocean overall speed record.

In order to receive a permit to row to Svalbard, Fiann needed to apply to the Governor of Svalbard, to introduce an evaluation of the chances and the team's ability to accomplish the expedition. Fiann estimated an average speed for the expedition of 2.7 Knots. The Governor's representative declared the claim a bluff, due to the present Arctic Ocean rowing overall speed record being 0.7 Knots and that small sail boats average 4 Knots. Thus, they pressed the highest possible insurance bond, which became the biggest element of the expedition budget. The accuracy of the ETA declared by Fiann deviated by 4h. As per plan, the rowers flawlessly caught the rising tide of the 108 km long Icy Fjord off of Longyearbyen.

The Polar Row I was the biggest record demolition in the history of ocean rowing: the existing Arctic Ocean record was broken by 3.5 times, despite the Polar Row I team being buffeted by headwinds 60% of the time. Fiann stated that the headwinds they faced were "a validation of our manpower performance". Upon this achievement he received Guinness Titles of: "First to row 4 Oceans" and "First to hold current speed records on all 4 oceans".

2019, Ocean Explorers Grand Slam 
In 2019 Fiann Paul led the first human-powered transit (by rowing) across the Drake Passage, and the first human-powered expedition on the Southern Ocean. It was accomplished on 25 December 2019 and he became the first and only person (as of 2020) to achieve the Ocean Explorers Grand Slam: performing open-water crossings on each of the five oceans using human-powered vessels. He also acted as stroke on the expedition.

Other information 
Fiann achieved the highest success rate in the history of ocean rowing, measuring the number of attempted-speed-records to successful expeditions. He was on stroke position for each row, the role that sets the boat's pace. His total effort performed in ocean rowing was compared to consecutively running approximately 300 marathons.  In an interview with Washington Times he mentioned that his resting heart rate during off-shift times throughout the record breaking crossings was 95 BPM, almost twice the normal resting heart rate. His record-breaking performance was listed by Grapevine Magazine as one of 7 most notable "Smitings" delivered in the history of Icelandic sports. In this act he was suspected of comradery with Ægir. Presently, he is one of the world's most accomplished rowers.

Pioneering and explorations 
In 2017, Fiann acted as captain, Stroke and Head of the project Polar Row.

Antarctic Ocean Open Waters

"The Impossible Row"

History 
The Antarctic Row was conceived in April 2017. Upon completion of Polar Row II in August 2017, in an interview with The New York Times, Fiann vowed he would row an even more difficult route. Next he needed to irreversibly prepay substantial sums of money 18-months in advance of the expedition in order to secure the assisting vessel, which is a requirement of the Antarctic Treaty and IAATO in order to receive a departure permit. Maritime law requires that small human-powered boats and primitive sailboats be accompanied by an assisting vessel during open-water journeys within the actual boundaries of the Southern Ocean. Fiann mentioned that it was all the money he had at the time.

In September 2017 Fiann recruited the first team members, Andrew Towne and Jamie Douglas-Hamilton. The row was initially scheduled for December 2018 but was postponed due to lack of availability of the assisting vessel. In January 2019 he recruited Cameron Bellamy and John Petersen, completing the two-year-long team recruitment process in April 2019 when the final member, Colin O’Brady without prior rowing, ocean rowing or seafaring experience joined the team to serve as Fiann's first mate and aid the project financially. Colin's participation in the expedition was filmed by Discovery Channel as a series, "The Impossible Row" produced in part by Colin O’Brady himself, whose story the cameras follow. Later a documentary film under the same title was released by Discovery+

Abercrombie & Kent's Luxury Expedition Cruise detoured from its route to cheer Fiann in his efforts, the same cruise line which in Summer 2020, Fiann is signed as special guest lecturer, among lecturers such as Lech Walesa.

The row took 12 days, 1 hour and 45 minutes, breaking several Guinness World Records. The team experienced sub-zero temperatures, snow and hail, and slalomed gigantic ice bergs unique to Antarctica. Sea anchor was deployed 5 times due to difficult seas. Apart for the sea anchor days, significant mileage was made good against the wind, which differentiates human-power routes from the Trade Winds and Anti-trades routes. Guinness World Records editor-in-chief, Craig Glenday, congratulated captain Fiann Paul in person and commented:"This row represents one of the most significant human-powered adventures ever undertaken."Upon arrival to Antarctica, Fiann recited The Great Sea Song poem by Canadian Inuit poet Uvavnuk, cousin of Aua. On Christmas Day, Icelandic national newspaper published an article about Fiann's accomplishment, dubbed: "Feasted with Ægir on Christmas." Fiann Paul received congratulations in person from the president of Iceland, Guðni Th. Jóhannesson. As of 2020, Fiann is the captain of the only three successful human-powered pioneering expeditions into the open-waters of both polar regions. Despite rowing many of the world's most difficult seas, Fiann never capsized the boat under his command.

Viking mark 
Fiann was the first modern day ocean rower to introduce a system of shifts depending on the mileage mark reached by rowers, instead of the more typically used time mark. This system allows rowers to choose how fast they complete their shift and allows the resting rowers to rest longer if the active shifts are completed with a slower pace. Recently, such a system is credited to be linked to the etymology of the word ‘Viking’.

Art 

As an artist, Fiann is the author of numerous national-level Icelandic and international exhibitions including several large-scale, outdoor art installations. His work mainly focuses on themes of indigenous people, children, breastfeeding and animal rights.

He was one of two authors of "Dialog", an outdoor art installation that spanned two main streets in the heart of the capital city with photographs of Icelandic children, 2008. He was also the author of the visual art project, "See It!" promoting the awareness of breastfeeding, an outdoor art installation in downtown Reykjavík at the facade of street Tryggvagata in 2011.

As an artist, Fiann was also involved in supporting the welfare of an endangered local breed of horses unique to the Faroe Islands. As a photographer he also documented many of his expeditions.

Since 2009 his Arctic photographs have been on permanent display at the International Terminal of Kulusuk Airport, the main airport of East Greenland. Some of his photographs of breastfeeding are displayed in Ísafjörður Hospital. Together with photographs of RAX, Fiann's Arctic photographs were selected to represent Greenlandic Art at the Arctic Winter Games in Canada, 2010. In 2011 Fiann swam with seals in a freezing pond next to an outdoor display of his photographs at the Family Garden in Reykjavik. His name was officially added to the seals' family list and mentioned along with the other seals on the portal of Reykjavik City.

Intersection of activities 
On certain occasions, Fiann raised attention not as an athlete or an artist, but as someone uniquely combining different fields of activity. He was featured in a German TV documentary "On 3 Sofas" as a rare example of a person who achieves notable results in rarely combined disciplines, in this case, sports and art. Once in an interview with Icelandic National TV, Fiann was asked whether ocean rowing was in any way similar to art. Fiann responded affirmatively, adding that "They both connect to Depth". In this way, Fiann was also referring to his studies of Depth Psychology.

In an international television program, Trans World Sports, he was portrayed as someone active in the fields of art, sports and psychology. He discussed the concept of ‘Arete’, an ancient Greek training of young men into adulthood, which included physical, intellectual and artistic training. Arete emphasized that development in each of these aspects must be present.

After becoming a Jungian Psychoanalyst and a Chartered Geographer in 2021, he was sometimes referred to as a modern-day renaissance man.

Public speaking 

Since 2017, Fiann has been conducting lectures detailing the psychological aspects of ultra endurance sports and the psyche of explorers.

In 2019 Fiann spoke at TEDxBend, where he elaborated on the potential generated by psychological wounds and the possibility of deriving constructive outcomes based on the personality traits related to these wounds. Since December 2019 the talk has been featured by main TED.

Charity and education 
Fiann's very first creative project to receive public recognition was a charity event that he organized, in which Fiann collected funds and supervised the construction of a new facility building for Götusmiðjan, the center for youth at risk, in Iceland in 2007.

In 2011 Fiann and Natalie Caroline founded Fiann Paul Foundation, which built a primary school in the Himalayas in 2013. The school educates 150 pupils per year. The project demonstrates two of his academic interests, architecture and pedagogy. In addition to his formal education, Fiann spent 2 years in the Himalayas and  years in remote parts of Greenland. He considers this time as one of the most transformational periods in his life.

He has conducted multiple lectures, and workshops in different parts of the world.

In 2019 Fiann was appointed a coordinator for Ocean Rowing Society International, the governing body for international ocean rowing.

In 2020 he was awarded an Honorary Master Mariner from the Association of Master Mariners at Maritime University in Gdynia, Poland. Master Mariner is the highest seafarer qualification. In Poland, one needs to study for approximately 8 years to achieve this qualification.

In 2021 Fiann completed studies in Depth Psychology and completed a training to become a Jungian Analyst at the C.G. Jung institute in Zürich. His main focus is the psychology of ultra endurance performance, and the psychological dynamics within the psyche of explorers and endurance athletes.

In 2021 Fiann pro-bono developed a geodatabase that documents and processes the entire history of human-power ocean-exploration, dubbed by Guinness World Records “The first real adventure database”.

Honors

Performance based Guinness World Records

Guinness World's Firsts 
"World's First" is the highest form of Guinness World Record, the ownership of this title never expires. Most of World Firsts held by Fiann are direct and absolute firsts, not as a result of a sophisticated sub-categorization frequently claimed by adventurers nowadays.

Pioneering and explorations Guinness World's First titles 

 First to row 4 oceans, 2017
 First to row the Arctic Ocean open waters south to north
 First recorded complete human-powered crossing of the Barents Sea, 2017
 First to row the Arctic Ocean open waters north to south, 2017
 First recorded complete human-powered crossing of the Greenland Sea, 2017
 First to row the Arctic Ocean in both directions, 2017
 First to row across the Drake Passage, 2019
 First to row on the Southern Ocean, 2019
 First to row to the Antarctic continent, 2019
 First to row in both Polar Regions, 2019
 First to row on 5 oceans (first to complete Ocean Explorers Grand Slam), 2019

Other Performance Guinness World's First titles 

 First person to hold simultaneous overall speed Guinness World Records for ocean rowing all three oceans (hat-trick): 2016
 First person to twice hold three simultaneous overall ocean rowing speed records on different oceans (hat-trick): 2017
 First to hold current speed records on 4 oceans, 2017

Guinness Mosts 
Accumulative Guinness World Records for total number of accomplishments in Ocean Rowing

 Most ocean rowing speed records held simultaneously on different oceans (3), 2016
 Most ocean rowing speed records held simultaneously on different oceans, (4), 2017
 Most ocean rowing overall speed records within two consecutive years (2), 2017
 Most Polar Open Water rows completed by a rower (3), 2019
 Most latitude records held by a rower (6), 2019

Overall Speed Guinness World Records 
Multiple speed records exist on each ocean for different routes, classes and categories. The overall speed record however, is the highest type of speed record there is.

 Fastest crossing of the Atlantic Ocean, 2011
 Fastest crossing of the Indian Ocean, 2014
 Fastest crossing of the Mid-Pacific Ocean, 2016
 Fastest crossing of the Arctic Ocean, 2017

Other Speed Guinness World Records 

 Highest consecutive number of days rowed a distance over 100 miles a day (12 days), 2011
 Fastest row across the Indian Ocean by a team, 2014

Geographical Guinness World Records 
Latitude records can only be claimed within the expedition that meets the ocean rowing criteria of minimum distance covered.

Latitude Guinness World Records 

 Northernmost latitude (78°15'20'' N) reached by a rowing vessel, 2017
 Northernmost departure point (78°13' N), 2017
 Northernmost latitude reached by a rowing vessel (Arctic ice pack edge - 79°55'50'' N), 2017
 The southernmost start of a rowing expedition, 55° 58′ S
 The southernmost latitude reached by a rowing vessel, 64°14′S

Longest distance Guinness World Records 

 The longest distance rowed on the Arctic Ocean Open Waters within one expedition, 2017
 Longest distance rowed by a crew on the Indian Ocean, 2014
 Longest aggregated distance rowed in the Polar Open Water.

Ocean Rowing World Records 

 Most record-breaking ocean rower
 Most record-breaking ocean crossing, 2017
 Fastest ocean rowing boat in history as compared to the average speed of any row on any ocean, 2011

Other world records 

 Most record-breaking expedition in history, 2017

Other Honors and Awards 

 Blue Riband Trophy of Ocean Rowing, 2011
 Winner of the Great Pacific Race in classic class, 2016
 Winner of the Great Pacific Race in all classes (against open class), 2016
 Holder of majority of Icelandic Sports' Guinness World Records
 Oars of Anders Svedlund from friends and family of Anders Svedlund
 Diploma from Military Personnel of Jan Mayen for accomplishments in ocean rowing

Statistical facts 
As of 2020 his records constitute the majority of Icelandic sports Guinness World Records (76%, or 41 of 54 in total) 76% of Icelandic personal Guinness World Records (41 of 54 in total) and 36% of the total number of Icelandic Guinness World Records (41 of 105 including Iceland's records for natural phenomenon and geography). Other major holders of Icelandic sports' Guinness World records are Anníe Mist Þórisdóttir (3) and Hafþór Júlíus Björnsson (4).

Fiann Paul and Reinhold Messner were the only explorers to achieve Guinness World Records adjudicated hat-trick for exploration.

Personal life 
Fiann chooses to consume no alcohol. He mentioned music to be his only addiction. The only meat present in his diet is of fish origin, as he states that fish are the only animals he could handle killing by himself. He is also known for eating raw eggs, instead of protein shakes after training.

His favorite places in Reykjavik are Nauthólsvík, and Árbæjarlaug where his personalized outdoor workout is a major part of his daily training routine. He is a fan of Icelandic Sweaters.

Throughout his career Fiann has mentioned only one coach, Eygló Rós Agnarsdóttir, in an interview conducted in 2017

See also 

 Jean-Pierre Rives
 Ernie Barnes
 Rockwell Kent

Notes

References

External links 
 Collection of TV broadcasts covering Fiann's art
 Collection of TV broadcasts covering Fiann's sport achievements

1980 births
Living people
Icelandic rowers
Ocean rowers
Sports world record holders
Icelandic photographers
Installation artists
Explorers of the Arctic
Icelandic explorers
Icelandic motivational speakers
English-language haiku poets
Polar explorers
Explorers of Antarctica
Icelandic people of Polish descent
Jungian psychologists
Psychoanalysts
Poznań University of Technology alumni
Fellows of the Royal Geographical Society